Demush Mavraj Stadium is a stadium in Istog and is the home ground of KF Istogu of the Kosovar Superliga. It has a seating capacity of 6,000.                            

Football venues in Kosovo